Monkey Mountain Airport  is an airport serving the village of Monkey Mountain, in the Potaro-Siparuni Region of Guyana.

See also

 List of airports in Guyana
 Transport in Guyana

References

External links
Monkey Mountain Airport
OurAirports - Monkey Mountain
HERE/Nokia - Monkey Mountain

Airports in Guyana